The list of secondary, industrial and Decauville railways in Argentina includes narrow-gauge railway lines that operated in Argentina, which used tracks, sleepers, or vehicles manufactured by French company Decauville. The vast majority of those lines were freight services, although in some cases (such as the Ostende railway) also ran passenger services.

Notes

References

a
d
d
Rail
d
Railway lines in Argentina